The 1974 Australian Manufacturers' Championship was an Australian motor racing competition for Group C Touring Cars. It was authorised by Confederation of Australian Motor Sport as an Australian National Title.

The championship, which was the fourth Australian Manufacturers' Championship, was won by General Motors-Holden's.

Calendar
  

The championship was contested over a five round series with each round being a single race staged over a minimum distance of 250 km.

Class Structure
Cars competed in four engine capacity classes.
 Up to and including 1300 cc
 1301 to 2000 cc
 2001 to 3000 cc
 Over 3000 cc

Points system
For all rounds except the Bathurst round, championship points were awarded on a 9-8-7-6-5-4-3-2-1 basis for the first nine positions in each class plus 4-3-2-1 for the first four positions outright. For the Bathurst round only, championship points were awarded on an 18-16-14-12-10-8-6-4-2 basis for the first nine positions in each class plus 4-3-2-1 for the first four positions outright. Only the best placed car from each manufacturer was eligible to score points.

Results

References

Australian Manufacturers' Championship
Manufacturers' Championship